Baylor Ballpark is the baseball stadium at Baylor University in Waco, Texas. The stadium was built on the site of Ferrell Field, Baylor's home from 1977 to 1998, by mid-February in 1999. The Bears have hosted three NCAA regional and two super regional tournaments at Baylor Ballpark, including one of each in their College World Series season of 2005.

Attendance
Baylor drew 100,000 fans in a season for the first time in 2005 en route to the College World Series.  The Bears ranked in the nation's top 20 in attendance in the first nine full seasons they played at Baylor Ballpark.  The stadium was voted as the third best collegiate baseball stadium in a 2003 poll conducted by Baseball America.

In 2019, the Bears ranked 33rd among Division I baseball programs in attendance, averaging 1,981 per home game.

* - 1999 total reflects only games at Baylor Ballpark and does not include the 4 home games played at McLennan CC in Waco.  Baylor played its 1999 home schedule at Baylor Ballpark despite ongoing construction.

Climate

See also
 List of NCAA Division I baseball venues

References

External links
Baylor Ballpark

College baseball venues in the United States
Baylor Bears baseball
Baseball in Waco, Texas
Baseball venues in Texas
Sports venues in Waco, Texas
1999 establishments in Texas
Sports venues completed in 1999